The Pingtung Distillery is a distillery in Neipu Township, Pingtung County, Taiwan owned by Taiwan Tobacco and Liquor Corporation.

History
The distillery was originally established in 1898 as Taiwan Soutokufu Senbaikyoku in Pingtung City. In 1946, the distillery became an independent entity. In 1988, it was relocated to Neipu Township.

Architecture
The distillery spans over an area of 20 hectares.

See also
 Taiwanese cuisine

References

External links
  

1898 establishments in Taiwan
Buildings and structures in Pingtung County
Distilleries in Taiwan
Food and drink companies established in 1898